A carport is a covered structure used to offer limited protection to vehicles, primarily cars, from rain and snow. The structure can either be free standing or attached to a wall. Unlike most structures, a carport does not have four walls, and usually has one or two. Carports offer less protection than garages but allow for more ventilation. In particular, a carport prevents frost on the windshield.
A "mobile" and/or "enclosed" carport has the same purpose as a standard carport. However, it may be removed/relocated and is typically framed with tubular steel and may have canvas or vinyl type covering which encloses the complete frame, including walls. It may have an accessible front entry or open entryway not typically attached to any structure or fastened in place by permanent means put held in place by stakes. It is differentiated from a tent by its main purpose: to house vehicles and/or motorized equipment(a tent is to shelter people).

History
The term carport comes from the French term porte-cochère, referring to a covered portal. Renowned architect Frank Lloyd Wright coined the term when he used a carport in the first of his "Usonian" home designs: the house of Herbert Jacobs, built in 1936 in Madison, Wisconsin.

Quoting from the Carport Integrity Policy for the Arizona State Historic Preservation Office:

As early as 1909, carports were used by the Prairie School architect Walter Burley Griffin in his design for the Sloane House in Elmhurst, Illinois (Gebhard, 1991: 110). By 1913, carports were also being employed by other Prairie School architects such as the Minneapolis firm of Purcell, Feick & Elmslie in their design for a residence at Lockwood Lake, Wisconsin. In this instance, the carport was termed an "Auto Space" (Gebhard, 1991: 110). The late architectural historian David Gebhard suggested that the term "carport" originated from the feature's use in 1930s Streamline Moderne residences (Gebhard, 1991: 107). This term, which entered popular jargon in 1939, stemmed from the visual connection between these streamlined residences and nautical imagery. In the 1930s through the 1950s, carports were also being used by Frank Lloyd Wright in his Usonian Houses, an idea that he may have gotten from Griffin, a former associate.

The  W. B. Sloane House  in Elmhurst, Illinois, in 1910, is credited as being the first known home designed with a carport.

In describing the carport to Mr. Jacob, architect Wright said, "A car is not a horse, and it doesn't need a barn." He then added, "Cars are built well enough now so that they do not require elaborate shelter." Cars prior to this time were not completely water tight; the era of robotic-assembly, advanced materials, and perfect closure lines was still 50 years in the future.

The carport was therefore a cheap and effective device for protecting a car. Mr. Jacobs added: "Our cheap second-hand car had stood out all winter at the curb, often in weather far below zero (Fahrenheit). A carport was a downright luxury for it."

References 

Home
Parking
Architectural elements
Garden features